One Fierce Beer Coaster is the second studio album by American band Bloodhound Gang, released on December 3, 1996. Produced by Jimmy Pop, it was the band's first release on Geffen Records, and the first to feature "Evil" Jared Hasselhoff on bass guitar, and DJ Q-Ball on the turntables. The music of One Fierce Beer Coaster encompasses funk metal, hip hop and alternative rock, and its lyrics are rife with toilet humor.

One Fierce Beer Coaster was initially released by the independent label Republic Records before being re-released by Geffen Records due to underground popularity. The album has received mixed to moderately favorable reviews. Three singles were released from the album including "Fire Water Burn", "I Wish I Was Queer So I Could Get Chicks" and "Why's Everybody Always Pickin' on Me?" The first single, "Fire Water Burn", was a modern rock hit, landing on nine national charts.

Background and development

The Bloodhound Gang began as a small alternative band from King of Prussia, Pennsylvania. The band took its name from "The Bloodhound Gang", a segment on the 1980s PBS kids' show 3-2-1 Contact that featured three young detectives solving mysteries and fighting crime. The band comprised Jimmy Pop, Daddy Long Legs, M.S.G., Lupus Thunder, and Skip O'Pot2Mus. In April 1994, the band released their second demo tape, The Original Motion Picture Soundtrack to Hitler's Handicapped Helpers (1994). This earned the band a record deal with Cheese Factory Records, which was later renamed Republic Records. Later that year, the Bloodhound Gang released their first EP, Dingleberry Haze (1994).

In March 1995 the group signed to Columbia Records and released their first full-length album, titled Use Your Fingers (1995), but were subsequently dropped by the label. At this time Daddy Long Legs and M.S.G., who were angry with Columbia Records, left the band to form another rap group, Wolfpac. Bass player Evil Jared Hasselhoff, drummer Spanky G and turntablist D.J. Q-Ball joined Bloodhound Gang as replacements. In addition, Skip O'Pot2Mus eventually left to pursue a career outside of the music industry.

Music
The Bloodhound Gang entered Dome Sound/Ultra Psyche Studios with engineer Rich Gavalis in March 1996 to record One Fierce Beer Coaster. All of the songs were produced by Jimmy Pop, who also mixed most of the musical tracks on his personal Macintosh. The album was later mastered by Joe Palmaccio at Sterling Sound Studios in New York City.

Style

While the album's predecessor, Use Your Fingers, was written and recorded in a more hip hop-oriented style, featuring distinct rap beats, One Fierce Beer Coaster featured a more alternative-oriented sound. Stephen Thomas Erlewine of AllMusic described The Bloodhound Gang's sound as, "smarmy, smirky alternative funk-metal, complete with junk culture references and "ironic" musical allusions." Former Bloodhound Gang guitarist Lupus Thunder credits Weezer as an inspiration for "Fire Water Burn" and Lemonade and Brownies-era Sugar Ray for "Kiss Me Where It Smells Funny."

To create the hip-hop and rock fusions on the album, Jimmy Pop utilized the standard hip hop technique of sampling. The chorus for "Fire Water Burn" is taken from "The Roof Is on Fire" by Rock Master Scott & the Dynamic Three and also features the lyrics 'I am white like Frank Black is / So if man is five and the devil is six then that must make me seven / This honkey's gone to heaven,' a direct reference to the post-1993 stage name of Black Francis who wrote the Pixies song "Monkey Gone to Heaven" to which the lyrics allude. "Why's Everybody Always Pickin' on Me?" is built around a re-recorded sample of "Spooky", by Mike Sharpe as performed by Classics IV and also features a small lift from the Bill Cosby track "Greasy Kid Stuff."  Finally, the track "Your Only Friends Are Make Believe" features a chorus melody lifted from the Duran Duran song "Hungry Like the Wolf." "Lift Your Head Up High (And Blow Your Brains Out)" is built around a sample from "Get Up and Boogie" by the Silver Convention.

Lyricism
The lyrics for One Fierce Beer Coaster utilize over-the-top parody and toilet humor as means for comedy. For instance, the album opener, "Kiss Me Where It Smells Funny", is a song about a man and his new girlfriend and their adventures in cunnilingus. It was written by Jimmy Pop about his then-girlfriend; the next two albums would each have one song about said girlfriend - "Three Point One Four" and "No Hard Feelings”. "Lift Your Head Up High (And Blow Your Brains Out)" spoofs people who have considered suicide to go through with it, asserting that their lives are not worth the unhappiness. Three minutes into the song, Jimmy Pop says "Rewind and let me reverse it backwards like Judas Priest first did." Immediately after this, a four-second segment of backwards vocals repeats four times. When played in reverse, this segment says, "Devil shall wake up and eat Chef Boyardee Beefaroni."

The album's best-known single, "Fire Water Burn", is a diatribe against a white boy who attempts, and fails, to act like a black thug. "I Wish I Was Queer So I Could Get Chicks"  parodies the belief that girls only like gay men, playing on the stereotype that gay men are often better looking and more sensitive than straight men. "Why's Everybody Always Pickin' on Me?" is mainly about how Jimmy Pop was constantly picked on in high school and has since developed extreme katagelophobia, an intense fear of being ridiculed.

The album also includes a cover of Run-DMC's "It's Tricky" and "Boom", which features an appearance by Vanilla Ice.

Release and promotion

One Fierce Beer Coaster was originally released on Republic Records, which, under its earlier name, Cheese Factory Records, had previously released material by the band. As word-of-mouth praise for the album spread, however, Geffen Records signed the band after two months.

The original release contained a song called "Yellow Fever", which was about having sex with Asian women, as well as a hidden track on track number 69 on the original release. It consisted of an audio collage featuring Howard Stern talking about peanut butter, a televangelist, a news broadcast on the disease Lupus (a reference to Lüpüs Thünder), a phone call from a drunk friend of Jimmy's, and other assorted oddities. The Geffen re-release omitted this track. "Yellow Fever" and the hidden track were later released on an EP called One Censored Beer Coaster.

"Fire Water Burn" played a major role in the slow build of interest that ultimately led to the band's mainstream breakthrough. Because the band could not afford financially solvent national tours, they promoted themselves by sending their music to alternative rock-based radio stations across the country. Eventually, an intern brought the band to the attention of the music director of 107.7 The End in Seattle. The director, liking what he heard, played "Fire Water Burn" on his Friday night show. After airing, the station was flooded with phone calls asking about the song and the band and the director passed the song onto the music director at KROQ-FM in Los Angeles. This snowball effect eventually overwhelmed the band with demands for their new record. After hearing of the underground success One Fierce Beer Coaster was receiving, many record labels began courting the band. According to manager Brett Alperowitz in an interview with HitQuarters, Madonna's label Maverick "really wanted to sign the band in the worst possible way, even to the point where I had to tell Madonna that I couldn’t put her on the phone with Jimmy Pop." The band eventually signed a record deal with Geffen Records.

Controversy
When Geffen Records re-released the album, the label refused to release the song "Yellow Fever" because of its racial lyrical content. As such, the song was removed from Geffen pressings of the album. In response, Jimmy Pop told Yahoo! Launch that his band's music and lyrics were simply meant to be humorous:

In 2000, the song was the subject of further controversy when students at the University of Maryland, including members of the ECAASU and the LGBT Alliance, demanded the band be removed from a concert line-up.

The album has been released on vinyl three times. The first vinyl release was released on Republic Records and included "Yellow Fever" and the hidden track. In 2013, it was repressed again and did not include either "Yellow Fever" or the hidden track. A second reissue came out on 23 September 2016 through MVD Audio, using the same track list as the MOV issue.

Reception

Critical reception

One Fierce Beer Coaster has received mixed reviews. Officially reviewing the album for Amazon.com, Roni Sarig argued that while the band was "offensive, rude, stoopid , and vigorously gutter-minded", the album was "full of smart lines, great hooks, and creative arranging". In a three-out-of-five star review, AllMusic critic Stephen Thomas Erlewine wrote that, "One Fierce Beer Coaster was picked up by DGC about two months after its release [...] And, listening to the single, "Fire Water Burn," it's possible to hear why." However, Earlewine also wrote that "what really sinks the album is the revolting, sophomoric humor that passes for lyrics." In his review of the lead single "Fire Water Burn", Entertainment Weekly reviewer Matt Diehl referred to the band's music as "mumbling hip-hop slang with self-conscious Caucasian stiffness." Robert Christgau awarded the album two stars and identified it as an "honorable mention" (i.e., a "likable effort consumers attuned to [the record's] overriding aesthetic or individual vision may well enjoy"), writing that the album was "fighting for [the band's] right to show you their underpants".

Chart performance
On January 18, 1997, One Fierce Beer Coaster debuted on the Billboard 200 at number 132; it peaked at number 57 less than a month later. On October 16, 1998, the album was certified gold by the Recording Industry Association of America (RIAA), meaning that it had shipped 500,000 copies in the United States.

Track listing

Personnel
Adapted from the album booklet.

Band members
Jimmy Pop – lead vocals, guitar, samples, production
Lüpüs Thünder – backing vocals, guitar
Spanky G – drums
Evil Jared – bass
DJ Q-Ball – backing vocals, turntables, keys, programming

Guest musicians
Rob Van Winkle – guest vocals on "Boom"

Production
Avery Lipman – executive producer
Monte Lipman – executive producer
Joseph M. Palmaccio – mastering
Rich Gavalis – engineer, editing, mixing

Charts and certifications

Weekly charts

Year-end charts

Certifications

Singles

References

Bloodhound Gang albums
Republic Records albums
1996 albums
Geffen Records albums